Tarzetta is a genus of fungi in the family Pyronemataceae. The genus has a widespread distribution in north temperate regions, and contains 9 species.

References

External links

Pyronemataceae
Pezizales genera